The 1999 British Open was a professional ranking snooker tournament, that was held from 8–19 September 1999 at the Plymouth Pavilions, Plymouth, England.
 
Stephen Hendry won the tournament by defeating Peter Ebdon nine frames to five in the final, during which Hendry made a maximum break in the seventh frame. The defending champion, Fergal O'Brien, was defeated by Joe Swail in the last 16.


Main draw

Final

References

British Open (snooker)
British Open
Open (snooker)